Alfred Porterfield (born 1869,in Londonderry) was a professional footballer who played as a goalkeeper. He started his career in Scotland with Thistle FC then moved to Bootle where he played in 2 official FA Cup ties in 1890. His opponents were Newton Heath and Halliwell. Re-joined Thistle FC then signed for, Clyde. King's Park, before moving to Burnley in 1894, where he played two matches in the English Football League and ended his career with Cartvale. He died in Glasgow Green Public Park of heart attack on the 4th of May 1922.

References

1869 births
1922 deaths
Association football goalkeepers
Burnley F.C. players
English Football League players
King's Park F.C. players
Scottish footballers